Terry Glavin (born 1955) is a Canadian author and journalist.

Career
Born in the United Kingdom to Irish parents, he emigrated to Canada in 1957. Glavin has worked as a journalist and columnist for The Daily Columbian (reporter, columnist and assistant city editor), The Vancouver Sun (columnist), The Globe and Mail (columnist), The Georgia Straight (columnist), and The Tyee .   He has been with the Ottawa Citizen since 2011.  He has contributed articles to many newspapers and magazines, including Canadian Geographic, Vancouver Review, Democratiya, The National Post, Seed, Adbusters, and Lettre International (Berlin).  He founded and was chief editor of Transmontanus Books, an imprint of New Star Books.

He was a sessional instructor in the Writing Department of the Fine Arts Faculty at the University of Victoria in Victoria, BC, and an adjunct professor in the Department of Creative Writing at the University of British Columbia in Vancouver.

In 2009, he won the British Columbia Lieutenant Governor's Award for Literary Excellence for his books and magazine and newspaper articles.

Glavin's writing covers a wide range of regional and global topics from natural history and anthropology to current politics.  His work as a journalist and writer have taken him to Central America, China, the Eastern Himalayas, the Russian Far East, Afghanistan, and Israel, and his books have been published in Canada, the United States, the United Kingdom and Germany.  He is a signatory of the Euston Manifesto.

Bibliography

Glavin's first book, A Death Feast in Dimlahamid (1990), dealt with the struggles of the Gitxsan and Wet'suwet'en peoples, drawing on an account of the oral traditions of Dimlahamid, also known as Temlaham, an ancient city said to have existed in that region. His second book, Nemiah: The Unconquered Country (1992), a cultural and historical account of British Columbia's Chilcotin District, included some of the Tsilhqot'in people's perspective on the Chilcotin War of 1864.  Ghost in the Water, on the giant green sturgeon in British Columbia's rivers, was published by New Star in 1994.

Among his best known works is The Last Great Sea: A Voyage Through the Human and Natural History of the North Pacific Ocean (2000), which was nominated for the Bill Duthie Booksellers' Choice Award and the Roderick Haig-Brown Regional Prize, and was the winner of the Hubert Evans Non-Fiction Prize.
In total, he has authored seven books on his own, and three in collaboration with other authors.  Books published since The Last Great Sea are
 North of Caution, Vancouver: Ecotrust Canada, 2002 (with Ian Gill, Richard Manning, Ben Parfitt and Alex Rosel)
 Amongst God's Own: The Enduring Legacy of St. Mary’s Mission, Vancouver: New Star Books, 2002  (with former students of St. Mary's)
 Waiting for the Macaws: And Other Stories from the Age of Extinctions, Toronto: Viking Canada, 2006
 The Sixth Extinction: Journeys Among the Lost and Left Behind, New York: Thomas Dunne Books, 2006  
 Come from the Shadows: The Long and Lonely Struggle for Peace in Afghanistan, Vancouver: Douglas & McIntyre, 2011
 Sturgeon Reach: Shifting Currents At The Heart of the Fraser with Ben Parfitt, Vancouver: New Star Books, 2011

Other works by Glavin are:
 A Death Feast in Dimlahamid, Vancouver: New Star Books, 1990  (revised edition 1998)
 Nemiah: The Unconquered Country, Vancouver: New Star Books, 1992
 A Ghost in the Water, Vancouver: New Star Books, 1994
 Dead Reckoning: Confronting the Crisis in Pacific Fisheries, Vancouver: Greystone Books, 1996
 This Ragged Place: Travels Across the Landscape, Vancouver: New Star Books, 1996
 A Voice Great Within Us, Vancouver: New Star Books, 1998 (with Charles Lillard)
 The Last Great Sea: A Voyage Through the Human and Natural History of the North Pacific Ocean, Vancouver: Greystone Books, 2000

Awards
In 2009, Glavin was awarded the Lieutenant Governor's Award for Literary Excellence for contributing significantly to the development of literary excellence in British Columbia and the Hubert Evans Prize for Non-Fiction.  He has a total of eleven awards including several National Magazine Awards:

Best Column in a Magazine, Western Magazine Awards, 1998
Science, Technology and Medicine Prize, National Magazine Awards Foundation, 1998
Science Technology and Medicine Prize, Western Magazine Awards, 1998
Jack Webster Awards prize for Science and Technology, 1997
"Science in Society" prize from the Canadian Science Writers Association, 1996
Special Award for Editorial Innovation, Impact or Courage, Western Magazine Awards, 1994
Gold prize, Travel Writing, National Awards Foundation, 1994
Best Essay of the Year, National Magazine Awards Foundation, 1993
Best Essay, “Public Issues” Category, Western Magazine Awards
Science Technology and Medicine Prize, Western Magazine Awards, 1993
Silver Prize, National Magazine Awards

References

External links
 Audio interview with THECOMMENTARY.CA
 Terry Glavin: Chronicles and Dissent (his blog)
 Terry Glavin column on the National Post

1955 births
Living people
20th-century Canadian historians
Canadian male non-fiction writers
Journalists from British Columbia
Writers from British Columbia
Canadian political writers
British emigrants to Canada
Canadian people of Irish descent
Vancouver Sun people
20th-century Canadian journalists
20th-century Canadian male writers
21st-century Canadian historians
21st-century Canadian journalists
21st-century Canadian male writers